Eddie Hemmings may refer to:

Eddie Hemmings (cricketer) (born 1949), former England cricketer
Eddie Hemmings (rugby league), British rugby league television presenter